The Matt and Emma Hill Farmstead is a historic farmstead in Pike Township, Minnesota, United States.  It was established in 1897 by one of many Finnish Americans who left employment in Iron Range mines to begin farming northern Minnesota's cutover forests.  The farm was listed as a historic district on the National Register of Historic Places in 1990 for its state-level significance in the themes of agriculture, architecture, and European ethnic heritage.  It was nominated for reflecting the pivot of St. Louis County's Finnish immigrants from industrial labor to agriculture, and their use of traditional log architecture.

Description
The historic district consists of eight contributing properties.  A house, hay barn, cattle barn, outbuilding, and the farm's original smoke sauna date from 1897 to 1903.  An improved sauna was built around 1920.  All were designed and constructed in log by Matt Hill.  Rounding out the inventory of historic properties are the farm's well and agricultural fields.

See also
 National Register of Historic Places listings in St. Louis County, Minnesota

References

1897 establishments in Minnesota
Buildings and structures in St. Louis County, Minnesota
Farms on the National Register of Historic Places in Minnesota
Finnish-American culture in Minnesota
Finnish-American history
Historic districts on the National Register of Historic Places in Minnesota
Log buildings and structures on the National Register of Historic Places in Minnesota
National Register of Historic Places in St. Louis County, Minnesota